Mark Mayambela (born 9 September 1987) is a South African professional footballer who plays as a midfielder for Cape Umoya United.

Club career

Bloem Celtic
Mayambela began his professional career with Bloemfontein Celtic in 2007 after joining from the Old Mutual Academy. He made his debut for the club against Ajax Cape Town during the 2007–08 Absa Premiership season. During his time at the club he became a fan favourite and earned the nickname "the Professor", ultimately making 50 appearances before joining Orlando Pirates in 2010.

Orlando Pirates

Mayambela completed a transfer to Orlando Pirates on 27 July 2010, with Bennett Chenene joining Celtic as part of the deal. He struggled in Soweto, though, and by January 2013 had only started two matches in his three years with Pirates. He was linked with a move to Chippa United during the same month but the deal collapsed after he refused to sign a three-year contract, preferring to join on a six-month deal instead.

He made only one substitute appearance during the 2012–13 Premier Soccer League season following which Orlando Pirates elected to release him. During his time at the club, Orlando Pirates lifted two PSL titles, two MTN 8 titles, and one each in the Nedbank Cup and Telkom Cups. Following his release, Mayambela was linked with a move to an unnamed Turkish club and also trained with Moroka Swallows before signing a one-year deal with Mpumalanga Black Aces.

Black Aces
Mayambela officially joined Mpumalanga Black Aces in August 2013. His time at the club was short-lived, however, as he departed by mutual consent in October after he and teammate Mkhanyiseli Siwahla were alleged to have arrived at training under the influence of alcohol. Both players were asked to undergo alcohol tests at a clinic, but they refused and were suspended pending a disciplinary hearing. Mayambela and Siwahla then failed to attend at the hearing and were subsequently released from their contracts.

Mayambela later denied claims that he was drunk at training and stated that he left Aces because he was unhappy at the club. He failed to play in a single league match for the club and made his only appearance as a substitute in a Telkom Knockout game against former team Orlando Pirates.

Djurgårdens
Following his release from Black Aces, Mayambela trialled with Swedish side Djurgården who elected to sign him on a three-year deal. He made his debut for the club in the Swedish Cup on 9 March 2014 in a 2–0 win over Assyriska and made 15 league appearances in total, scoring once. His contract was terminated by mutual agreement in January 2015 after he had indicated that he wanted to return to South Africa, and he later revealed that his battles with injury and time on the bench had contributed to his decision.

Royal Eagles
Having once again become a free-agent, Mayambela signed for National First Division side Royal Eagles on a four-month deal in February 2015. He departed at the end of the season having made four appearances.

Chippa United
Following the expiration of his contract with Royal Eagles, Mayambela returned to the PSL when he signed a season-long deal with Port Elizabeth-based side Chippa United. Just six months into his contract, however, the club agreed to release Mayambela in order to allow him to join SuperSport United, with SuperSport agreeing to buy out the remainder of his contract. He made 10 appearances and scored twice during his time with the club.

SuperSport United
Mayambela officially joined SuperSport United on 15 January 2016 and signed a three-and-a-half-year contract with the club. Having been signed by Gordon Igesund, he struggled under new club-manager Stuart Baxter and made just four appearances for the club before once again being released. Baxter later stated that Mayambela had fallen short of the club's standards both on and off of the pitch.

Ajax Cape Town
Following his release from SuperSport United, Mayambela signed as a free-agent for Ajax Cape Town. He spent a solitary season at the club, making 24 appearances across all competitions.

Return to Chippa United
Mayambela was released by Ajax after one season following which he re-signed for Chippa United in July 2017. He scored his first goals since his return to the club on 4 February 2018, netting his first professional brace in a 3–3 draw with Platinum Stars. The following season, he was named captain of the side.

Cape Town City

On 1 October 2019, Mayambela signed for Cape Town City on a free transfer, after he was recommended to the club by former coach Benni McCarthy. He scored on his official debut later that day during a 2–1 defeat to AmaZulu. The goal was later registered as an own goal. After finding himself more on the stands than on the pitch, he parted ways with the club at the end of January 2020.

Honours

Club

Orlando Pirates
 Premier Soccer League: 2010–11; 2011–12
 MTN 8: 2010; 2011
 Telkom Knockout: 2011–12
 Nedbank Cup: 2010–11

Personal life
Mark is the older brother of Mihlali Mayambela who is also a professional footballer currently playing in Portugal.

References

1987 births
South African soccer players
South African expatriate soccer players
Living people
Association football midfielders
Sportspeople from Cape Town
Bloemfontein Celtic F.C. players
Orlando Pirates F.C. players
Mpumalanga Black Aces F.C. players
Djurgårdens IF Fotboll players
Chippa United F.C. players
SuperSport United F.C. players
Cape Town Spurs F.C. players
Cape Town City F.C. (2016) players
Cape Umoya United F.C. players
South African Premier Division players
Allsvenskan players
South African expatriate sportspeople in Sweden
Expatriate footballers in Sweden